MORN1 containing repeat 1, also known as Morn1, is a protein that in humans is encoded by the MORN1 gene.

The function of Morn1 is not yet well understood. Orthologs have been found in eukaryotes and bacteria.

Gene 

The MORN1 gene is located on Chromosome 1 at locus 1p36.33 and contains 7 MORN repeats. It has 1641 base pairs in 14 exons in the reference sequence mRNA transcript.

MORN1 is nearby the SKI gene which encodes the SKI protein, LOC100129534, and RER1 gene on the positive strand of chromosome 1.On the minus strand, the PEX10 gene occurs further upstream of Morn1.

Alternative splicing 

MORN1 contains 19 different GT-AG introns, and 15 different mRNAs; 11 of which are produced by alternative splicing and 4 of which are unspliced. Of these variants there are 4 probable alternative promoters, 9 non-overlapping alternative last exons and 6 alternative polyadenylation sites. 753  of this gene are antisense (on + strand) to spliced SKI gene, and 193  to RER1 which may contribute to regulation of expression of itself or of its flanking genes.

Protein 

The MORN1 gene encodes a protein of 497 amino acids and contains two overlapping conserved protein domains. The first is the MORN repeat region in which the protein contains 7 MORN repeats (at residues 38-211) belonging to protein family: pfam02493. The second is a multidomain uncharacterized protein conserved in bacteria: COG4642 which contains the MORN repeat region plus the beginning target sequence (1–211). The other 286 amino acids are less conserved among orthologs (especially distant orthologs) and belong to no known protein family.

The unmodified protein is predicted to have a molecular weight of 53,835.05 Daltons and an isoelectric point of 6.673. The protein has no long hydrophobic regions, suggesting it is not a transmembrane protein. It has been predicted to be localized in the cytoplasm, the nucleus or mitochondrial.

The genomic context may not necessarily infer function, but Morn1 has been predicted to contain a second peroxisomal targeting signal using PSORTII at residues 451: RLPPAFKHL, which may suggest interaction with PEX10 (see genomic context above).

Morn1 was also predicted to contain a nuclear export signal near the end of the protein at amino-acids LELH 334–338 (non-MORN repeat-containing region).

Post-translational modification 

Morn1 was predicted to have several glycosylation sites at the Serine 488 and at Threonine residues.
There were also conserved Serine, Tyrosine and Threonine residues that were predicted Phosphorylation sites that were conserved among orthologs. See image of the Multiple Sequence alignment and Texshade.

MORN 

The Membrane Occupation and Recognition Nexus is a repeat that is found in multiple copies in several proteins including junctophilins. A MORN-repeat protein has been identified in the parasite Toxoplasma gondii and other Apicomplexan protists.

In T. gondii, MORN1 plays role in nuclear division and daughter cell budding. It is specifically associated with the spindle poles, the anterior and interior rings of the inner membrane complex during asexual reproduction/sexual reproduction; budding; and schizogony (see Apicomplexan cellular morphology).

Over-expression of MORN1 resulted in specific, severe defects in nuclear segregation and daughter cell formation. It was hypothesized that “Morn1 functions as a linker protein between certain membrane regions and the parasite's cytoskeleton.” The Morn repeats are not identical, but follow a general pattern of beginning with a YeG sequence, and specifically the subsequent Glycine residues are well conserved even within microbial orthologs which may suggest that the glycine residues may be important and/or involved in some structural function of the protein.

Tissue distribution 

Expressed Sequence Tag and microarray data suggests that Morn1 is expressed predominantly in the brain, eyes, lungs, parathyroid, salivary gland, testis, kidneys, trachea, and to a lesser extent the ovaries, prostate, thymus and the trachea. It is expressed in adults and in fetuses. By health state, Morn1 appears to be expressed in the normal state, as well as germ cell and kidney tumors.

Orthologs 

The orthologs of the Morn1 protein are listed below obtained by BLAST analysis. The conservation of this protein is conserved in mammals and invertebrates. Reptiles, insects and birds do not seem to show much conservation of this protein while bacteria and protists show similar conservation as in birds and reptiles, but these organisms are much more evolutionarily distant from humans.

Structure similarity 

Based on C-blast results Morn1 has a sequence similarity to that of Chain A, of Histone methyltransferase Set79. Morn1 aligns with 77 amino acids of this chain from residues 81–158.

References

Further reading

Human proteins